Edward Alexander may refer to:
 Edward Porter Alexander (1835–1910), mathematician, author, and Confederate Civil War soldier from Washington, Georgia
 Edward P. Alexander (1907–2003), museum administrator and author from Edmeston, New York
 Eddie Alexander (born 1964), Scottish cyclist
 Edward Alexander (actor) (1886–1964), American actor, see Film adaptations of Uncle Tom's Cabin
 Edward Alexander (professor) (1936–2020), American professor emeritus of English
 Edward Bruce Alexander (1872–1955), British civil servant in Ceylon
 Edward Johnston Alexander (1901–1985), American botanist
 Edward I. Alexander (1850–1911), Florida state legislator
 Edward Perkins Alexander (1863–1931), Welsh rugby union player
 Edward McGill Alexander (born 1947), general in the South African Army

See also